Jorge Eduardo "Eddie" Gutierrez (born February 13, 1983) is an American soccer player who currently plays for Fresno Fuego in the USL Premier Development League.

Career

College and amateur
Gutierrez attended Porterville High School, and played one year of college soccer at Fresno State University before transferring to Fresno Pacific University in 2002. He finished his collegiate career at FPU in 2004, and was a 2003 first team NAIA All American and a 2004 second team All American.

Gutierrez also spent five years with Fresno Fuego in the USL Premier Development League, helping the team to win PDL Western Conference championships in 2004 and 2007.

Professional
In May 2008, Gutierrez began his professional career with Miami FC in the USL First Division. On August 1, 2008, Miami traded Gutierrez to the Carolina RailHawks in exchange for Connally Edozien. He finished the season with the RailHawks, but was not signed for the 2009 season. He returned to Fresno to play with Fresno Fuego in April 2009.

References

Living people
1983 births
American soccer players
North Carolina FC players
Fresno Fuego players
Fresno State Bulldogs men's soccer players
Miami FC (2006) players
USL First Division players
USL League Two players
People from Porterville, California
Soccer players from California
Association football defenders